Hurungwe East is a constituency of the National Assembly of the Parliament of Zimbabwe, located in Mashonaland West Province. Its current MP since the 2018 election is Ngoni Masenda of ZANU–PF.

References 

Mashonaland West Province
Parliamentary constituencies in Zimbabwe